Karim Uddin Ahmed is a Bangladesh Awami League politician and the former Member of Parliament of Rangpur-6.

Career
Mohammad was elected to parliament from Rangpur-6 as a Bangladesh Awami League candidate in 1973.

References

Awami League politicians
1923 births
1981 deaths
1st Jatiya Sangsad members